The National Soccer League 1983 season was the seventh season of the National Soccer League in Australia.  The champions were St George, winning the title on the last day of the season from Sydney City SC.

League table

Individual awards

Player of the Year: Joe Watson (Sydney City)
U-21 Player of the Year: Oscar Crino (South Melbourne)
Top Scorer(s): Doug Brown (South Melbourne – 16 goals)
Coach of the Year: Frank Arok (St George-Budapest)

References
OzFootball Archives - 1983 NSL Season

National Soccer League (Australia) seasons
1
Aus